The 1999 Copa América Final was the final match of the 1999 Copa América. It was held on 18 July 1999, in Asunción. Brazil won the match against Uruguay 3–0, earning a sixth Copa América title.

Match details

|}

References

External links
Copa América 1999 Official Site

Final, 1999
Brazil national football team matches
Uruguay national football team matches
 
1999
 
Sports competitions in Asunción
1999 Copa America Final
Brazil–Uruguay football rivalry
July 1999 sports events in South America